The 2011 World Mixed Doubles Curling Championship was held at the Saint Paul Curling Club in St. Paul, Minnesota, United States from April 15 to 24, 2011. The event was held in conjunction with the 2011 World Senior Curling Championships.

Switzerland won its third mixed doubles gold in four years by defeating the Russians in a six-end final with a final score of 11–2.

Teams

Round-robin standings
Final round-robin standings

Round-robin results
All draw times are listed in Central Standard Time (UTC-06).

Blue group

Sunday, April 17
Draw 1
11:30

Draw 2
15:00

Monday, April 18
Draw 4
08:00

Draw 7
21:30

Tuesday, April 19
Draw 9
15:00

Wednesday, April 20
Draw 12
08:00

Draw 13
11:00

Draw 14
14:30

Thursday, April 21
Draw 17
08:00

Draw 18
11:30

Draw 20
18:00

Draw 21
21:30

Red group

Sunday, April 17
Draw 2
15:00

Monday, April 18
Draw 4
08:00

Draw 6
18:00

Draw 7
21:30

Tuesday, April 19
Draw 8
11:30

Draw 9
15:00

Draw 10
18:00

Wednesday, April 20
Draw 12
08:00

Draw 14
14:30

Draw 15
18:00

Draw 16
21:30

Thursday, April 21
Draw 18
11:30

Draw 19
14:30

White group

Sunday, April 17
Draw 2
15:00

Draw 3
21:30

Monday, April 18
Draw 5
14:30

Draw 6
18:00 

Draw 7
21:30

Tuesday, April 19
Draw 8
11:30

Draw 9
15:00

Draw 11
21:30

Wednesday, April 20
Draw 12
08:00

Draw 15
18:00

Draw 16
21:30

Thursday, April 21
Draw 17
08:00

Draw 18
11:30

Draw 19
14:30

Draw 20
18:00

Tiebreakers
Friday, April 22, 08:00

Friday, April 22, 11:30

Playoffs

Qualification Game
Friday, April 22, 15:00

Quarterfinals
Friday, April 22, 20:00

Semifinals
Saturday, April 23, 9:00

Bronze medal game
Saturday, April 23, 14:00

Gold medal game
Saturday, April 23, 14:00

References
General

Specific

World Mixed Doubles Curling Championship, 2011
World Mixed Doubles Curling Championship
2011 in American sports
2011 in sports in Minnesota
International curling competitions hosted by the United States
Curling in Minnesota